Samuel Green (1615 – January 1, 1702) was an early American printer, the first of several printers from the Green family who followed in his footsteps. One of Green's major accomplishments as a printer was the Eliot Indian Bible, translated by the missionary John Eliot, which became the first Bible to be printed in British America in 1663.  Members of his family who also became printers include his sons  Bartholomew, Bartholomew Green, Jr. and Joseph Dennie.  Throughout his adult life Green also served in the Massachusetts Bay Colonial Militia, advancing to the rank of captain later in life.

Early life and family
Green was born in England, the son of Bartholomew and Elizabeth. Green was a colonial American printer who emigrated to the American colonies about 1633 aboard the Arbella, and settled in Cambridge, Massachusetts, arriving  with John Winthrop, one of the leading men involved in establishing Massachusetts Bay Colony.

Green married twice, the marriages of which produced nineteen children. Some of his sons also became printers, working in Connecticut, Maryland, Pennsylvania and Nova Scotia, among other places. His first wife, was Jane Banbridge, who died on November 16, 1657, after which on February 23, 1662, he married Sarah Clark (1644-1707). Green had a daughter, Elizabeth, who became involved with Marmaduke Johnson, sent over from England to assist him in his printing business, but when Johnson, who had a wife back in England, proposed to her, without Green's consent, it put a serious strain on their business relationship, though they still managed, however, to work well together.

Samuel Green was a progenitor of the Green family of printers. His son, Samuel Jr., was from his first wife. Samuel's son from his second wife, Bartholomew Green Sr., (1666–1732) was a printer, and his son, Bartholomew Green Jr. was the printer of The Boston News-Letter. Timothy Green was the son of Samuel Green, Jr., who was also a printer in Boston who produced works for booksellers. Samuel's great-grandson was Timothy Green. Timothy had a son, Jonas Green, who settled at New London in 1714.

Printing career
Green was among the first printers to emerge in the American colonies who arrived at Cambridge some eight years before Stephen Daye who brought over America's first printing press from England. No records of Green's printing activity, however, are extant until ten years after Daye began his printing operation in Cambridge. Green was also Cambridge's town clerk, and captain of the town militia. 

When Daye finally retired Green took over as the manager of the Cambridge press, which President Henry Dunster of Harvard College had acquired. and  held that office for approximately fifty years. Historian John W. Moore assumes that that Green had learned the printing trade from observing Daye, if he hadn't already learned the trade while in England. By 1656 Green had two printing-presses operating at the Cambridge office. Dunster was forced to resign in 1654, and Green sold his press to Harvard College, and around 1670 the Society's press was also placed its control. With some interruptions Green continued as the college printer. He was also printer for the Colony through 1691.

The colony of Connecticut commissioned Green in Cambridge to handle its official printing for many years, and later employed his sons Samuel and Bartholomew Green in Boston to oversee and complete the printing of their laws and other documents. In 1673 Samuel Green also made use of Greek and Hebrew letters with the Cambridge press in the printing of Urian Oakes's work, entitled New England Pleaded with. The occurrence of such type was rare in colonial printing houses.

Green, with the assistance of Marmaduke Johnson, was commissioned by the Commissioners of the United Colonies in New England in 1661 to print the Eliot Indian Bible, written by missionary John Eliot and consisting of the New and Old Testaments, translated from English to the Massachusett Indian language, which they completed in 1663 after two years labor. The work was printed with two title pages, with one in English and one in the Massachusett Indian language. The two testaments were then bound together making one complete Bible. A Catechism, and the Psalms of David in Indian verse were also attached to it. This became the first Bible in any language that was printed in America. 

A copy of the completed Indian Bible, bound in an elaborate leather cover, was presented to Charles the Second, which included a dedication of thanks and gratitude for his support, making possible the expensive task involved in the printing production.

In 1662, Green, sometimes working alone or with the assistance of Johnson, was paid on average of 60 shillings a sheet for printing forty-six sheets of the Eliot Indian Bible. Normally this would be considered a high rate to pay for such a production, however, as the pages were set in a nine point type, in a double column format, in an Indian language that was completely unknown to Green and Johnson, where the rate of production was only but a sheet a week, the rate was more than justified. Green first handled the binding of the Eliot Indian Bible'''s New Testament in 1661, but by 1663 he commissioned John Ratcliff of Boston to handle the binding of the whole Indian Bible.

During the printing production of the Indian Bible, Johnson, though considered a good worker, would sometimes take leave of absence for extended periods of time, leaving Green to handle the large task by himself, which impeded the rate of production. Subsequently, as soon as Johnson's printing contract was completed in 1664 he was dismissed, and sent back to England. Upon his arrival there, however, he was appointed the official printer for the New England Company, replacing Green, which by some accounts was prompted by John Eliot's insistence. This course of events resulted in Green losing much of his income that he otherwise obtained from the sale of the Indian tracts.

Green also printed several editions of The Book of the General Lawes and Libertyes concerning the citizens of Massachusetts, along with several editions of the Bay Psalm Book, and several Indian books, which were among his primary works. The list of extant works produced by Green number approximately 275.

Other works printed by Green include:
 Mather, Richard, 1657. Farewell Exhortation to the Church and People of Dorchester in New England.
 Philomathemat, S. B., 1657. Almanac for 1657.
 Norton, John, 1657. The Life and Death of that deservedly Famous Mr. John Cotton, the late Reverend Teacher of the Church of Christ at Boston in New England.
 Peirson, Abraham, (Pastor) 1658. Some Helps for the Indians ; shewing them how to improve their natural Reason, to know the true God, and the Christian Religion.
 Zech. Brigden, 1659. An Almanac of the Celestial Motions.
 Chauncy, Nathaniel, 1662. Almanac for 1662.
 Chauncy, Charles, 1662. Anti-Synodalia Scripta Americana ; or, a Proposal of the Judgment of the Dissenting Messengers of the Churches of New England...  Green's last imprint was Cotton Mather's, Ornaments for the Daughters of Zion'', (1692)
Green also had considerable landholding in Massachusetts. Besides printing, another of his chief avocations, was serving in the Massachusetts Bay Colonial Militia where he was very active. He became a sergeant by  1653, but thereafter rose in rank slowly, and finally achieved the rank of captain in 1689 when he was seventy-five years of age, and he remained in that office for the rest of his days.

See also 

 Early American publishers and printers
 List of early American publishers and printers
 Samuel Hall (printer) — First printer to arrive in Salem, Massachusetts, 1668
 Robert Aitken (publisher) — Printed the first Bible in America in the English language in 1782

 Newspapers of colonial America

Notes

Citations

Bibliography

  

 

 

 

 

 

 

 

 

 

 

 

 

 

 

   Alternative printing

 

1614 births
1702 deaths
American printers
Kingdom of England emigrants to Massachusetts Bay Colony
Businesspeople from Cambridge, Massachusetts
History of Cambridge, Massachusetts
Colonial American printers